Dren is a village located in the municipality of Zubin Potok, in Kosovo. According to 2009 estimates for the 2011 Kosovan census, it has 16 inhabitants, of whom the majority are Serbs.

History
During World War II, Dren was among the villages in North Kosovo that was burned down by Albanian paramilitaries and the Serb population expelled.

Notes

References

Villages in Zubin Potok